László Széchy (18 November 1891 – 9 December 1963) was a Hungarian fencer. He won a silver medal at the 1924 Summer Olympics in the team sabre competition.

References

External links
 

1891 births
1963 deaths
Sportspeople from Arad, Romania
Hungarian male sabre fencers
Olympic fencers of Hungary
Fencers at the 1924 Summer Olympics
Olympic silver medalists for Hungary
Olympic medalists in fencing
Medalists at the 1924 Summer Olympics